Can't Get Enough (1986) is the 23rd album by Menudo. This is their third album in English and features Charlie Massó, Robby Rosa, Ricky Martin, Raymond Acevedo and Sergio Blass. This is the fourth album recorded by this line-up, and would become Charlie's and Robby's last album recorded as members of the group. The songs on this album consist of five brand new songs and four songs from their Refrescante album translated into English.

Tracks
 Summer In The Streets [3:51] - Robby Rosa 
 We Have A Song [3:46] - Robby Rosa
 Tell Me How You Feel [3:31] - Raymond Acevedo
 No One Can Love You More [3:57] - Robby Rosa
 Old Enough To Love [3:22] - Robby Rosa
 Jumpin' Over [3:25] - Charlie Massó Salta La Valla
 I Can't Spend Another Day [3:37] - Ricky Martin Con Un Beso Y Una Flor
 Stay With Me [4:00] - Robby Rosa Besame
 Marie (I Need You) [3:09] - Sergio Blass Amiga Mia

References

1986 albums
Menudo (band) albums